Stefanus Lourens Muller (1917–2005) was a South African politician and cabinet minister.

Biography
Lourens Muller was born in Beaufort West in the Cape Province in 1917. Muller worked for South African Railways before studying law and practicing as a lawyer in Robertson. He was married to the soprano singer Hanlie van Niekerk, but divorced soon afterwards. In 1961, he was elected to parliament as the National Party candidate in the constituency of Ceres. Muller initially worked under the Justice ministry, then held several ministerial posts under prime minister John Vorster with whom he had developed a close political alliance. Under the Voster and Botha governments, Muller held the ministries of Police, Economic Affairs, Home Affairs and Transport.

After Vorster's resignation as State President in the aftermath of the information scandal, Muller was widely considered the favourite to succeed him. The position instead went to Marais Viljoen.

Muller was dismissed from the government by prime minister P. W. Botha, after a growing series of disagreements. After his dismissal, Muller left the National Party in 1980 and later became a founding member of Andries Treurnicht's Conservative Party. In 1981, Muller would retire from parliament at that year's general election. He died after a period of illness in 2005. He had been treated at a clinic in Somerset West before his death.

References

 

1917 births
2005 deaths
White South African people
National Party (South Africa) politicians
Members of the House of Assembly (South Africa)
Ministers of Home Affairs of South Africa